Brigadier General Raimundo Rolón Villasanti  (Paraguarí, March 14, 1903 –  Asunción, November 17, 1981) was briefly President of Paraguay from January 30, 1949, to February 27, 1949.

He served as Defense Minister under Natalicio Gonzalez until he led a coup against him in January 1949.

References

1903 births
1981 deaths
People from Paraguarí
Paraguayan military personnel
Colorado Party (Paraguay) politicians
Presidents of Paraguay